Isabel Chikoti (born May 24, 1991) is a Zambian model and beauty pageant titleholder. In 2017, she won the Miss Zambia competition and was the country's representative at the Miss Universe the same year.

Miss Universe Zambia 2017
Chikoti was crowned Miss Universe Zambia 2017 at the conclusion of the event held at the Mulungushi Conference Centre. She beat 16 other candidates for the title. Mercy Mukwiza placed 1st Princess while Luwi Kawanda placed 2nd Princess.

Miss Universe 2017
Chikoti represented Zambia at the Miss Universe 2017 pageant on November 26, 2017, but did not place.

References

Zambian beauty pageant winners
Miss Universe 2017 contestants
1991 births
Living people
Zambian models